Takht-e Soleyman Massif is a subrange of central Alborz mountains. In the area, about 160 distinct peaks higher than 4,000m are distinguishable, with the highest, most famous, and most technical one: Alam Kuh, 4,850m. The area can be captured inside a rectangle of 30 km width and 40 km length. The massif is limited to Taleqan valley from south, Kelardasht green plane from east, Abbas Abad rain forest & thick vegetated hills/slopes at north, and Shahsavar rain forests and Se Hezar valley at west.

Discovery
The original and pre Islamic name is Takht-e-Jamshid - The Takht-e-Soleiman region was virtually unknown until the 1930s. Freya Stark travelled there in 1931 and described her thwarted efforts to climb Takht-e Suleyman in The Valleys of the Assassins. Douglas Busk, a British mountaineer, explored the area in 1932, and made the first recorded ascent of Alam Kuh in 1933 via the east ridge. Later on, Busk along with Professor Bobek made a detailed survey of this area. In 1936 the north-west ridge (called Germans flank) of Alam Kuh was climbed for the first time by German mountaineers, which was considered a great achievement among European climbers.

References

External links
 Introduction to Takht-e Soleyman Massif at summitpost.org

Mountain ranges of Iran
Glaciers of Iran